Girolamo Romani, known as Romanino (c. 1485 - c. 1566), was an Italian High Renaissance painter active in the Veneto and Lombardy, near Brescia. His long career brought forth several different styles.

Biography

Romani was born in Brescia. His early training and life are not well documented.

A Quattrocento-esque Pietà, painted for the church of San Lorenzo of Brescia, dated from 1510, is exhibited in the Accademia. He took up residence in Venice in his twenties, at the latest by 1513. He was commissioned to complete a Madonna enthroned with four saints for the church of Santa Giustina  in Padua in 1513. The coloration of the painting is of Venetian style, but the duller visages in bejeweled setting recalls styles of previous generations. He completed series of frescoes for Niccolò Orsini's Palace in Ghedi and an altarpiece for San Francesco, Brescia.

Romanino completed four frescoes in the nave of the cathedral of Cremona in 1519-1520 depicting stories of the Passion of Christ.  His paintings have eclectic influences using Venetian coloration with Florentine-Lombard modeling. In the Cremona frescoes, the Lombard influence of Altobello Melone is strong, in the narrative and decorative elements of the fresco. By 1521, Romanino was replaced by Il Pordenone in the decoration of the church.

He then returned to Brescia to work (1521–1524) with Alessandro Bonvicino in the decoration of the "Cappella del Sacramento" in San Giovanni Evangelista. 

His St. Matthew and the Angel depicts the apostle at work under candlelight, and represents one of the first such nocturnes in Italian painting, a device which Correggio and Cambiaso would soon pursue.<ref>[http://artyzm.com/e_obraz.php?id=244 St. Matthew and the Angel from S. Giovanni Evangelista.]</ref> He also helped decorate the Palazzo Averoldi. A series of frescoes in the Castle of Malpaga, near Bergamo (1520-1530s), celebrating the life of Bartolomeo Colleoni, is attributed to him.

In 1531 to 1532, he worked with Dosso Dossi in fresco decoration of Castello del Buoncosiglio in Trento. He completed organ shutters for the church of Asola on Augustus and the sibyl, and Sacrifice of Isaac. Around 1545 he produced The Feast in the House of Simon the Pharisee, still in Brescia. He died between 1559 and 1561. His main pupils were his son-in-law Lattanzio Gambara, Girolamo Muziano, and Stefano Rosa. He is also known to have influenced artists such as Giulio Campi.

Stolen painting
Shortly after the 1940 Nazi invasion of France,  Romanino's painting Christ Carrying the Cross'' was stolen from the household of Frederico Gentili di Giuseppe, an Italian Jew. In 2012, it was discovered among items lent to an American museum from an Italian museum. Through the help of an anonymous tip, Interpol and the United States Department of Homeland Security, it was eventually returned to Gentili's heirs. Presently it is insured for US$2.5 million.

References

Sources

External links

Painters of reality: the legacy of Leonardo and Caravaggio in Lombardy, an exhibition catalog from The Metropolitan Museum of Art (fully available online as PDF), which contains material on Romani (see index)

1480s births
1560s deaths
15th-century Italian painters
Italian male painters
16th-century Italian painters
Italian Renaissance painters
Painters from Brescia